Aminuddin Baki Institute (IAB) is the main educational management institute in Malaysia which trains people to be in the school top management. The main campus is located in Bandar Enstek, Labu, Negeri Sembilan. IAB also have four branches in Genting Highlands (Pahang), Jitra (Kedah), Kota Kinabalu (Sabah) and Kuching (Sarawak). Institut Aminuddin Baki is a member of ANTRIEP, the Asian Network of Training And Research Institutions in Educational Planning.

References

External links

Ministry of Education (Malaysia)
Research institutes in Malaysia
Colleges in Malaysia
Educational institutions established in 1979
1979 establishments in Malaysia
Education schools in Malaysia